Music Is My Savior is the debut album from the American King Music artist Mims (both the artist's family name and a backronym representing Music Is My Savior). It was released on March 27, 2007. It includes the singles "This Is Why I'm Hot", "Like This" and "Just Like That".

Background

Guests 
The album features guest appearances by southern rapper Bun B, underground rapper Bad Seed, LeToya Luckett, Cham, reggae artist Junior Reid, and R&B singer J. Holiday. Capitol Records labelmate Rasheeda provides additional vocals on the song, "Like This."

Production 
Music Is My Savior features production from Blackout Movement, Twizz & D. Baker, Ty Fyffe, and The Runners. The bulk of the album was produced by  Blackout Movement. Mims has mentioned numerous times that he feels that his project benefited greatly from his extensive work with the Blackout Movement. He says that he likes them because they give a different sound to his music.

Singles 
Singles from Music Is My Savior included the hit single "This Is Why I'm Hot," "Like This" and "Just Like That."

The song "Cop It" was featured in the EA Sports game Madden 08, but was not released as a single.

A snippet of the song 'Superman' was used in Britain's Got Talent 2009 winners Diversity (dance troupe)'s routine.

Reception

Critical 
The album so far has a score of 64 out of 100 from Metacritic based on "generally favorable reviews". Rolling Stone gave it three out of five stars, claiming "Mims can't carry a whole album." Allmusic gave the album three and a half stars out of five. It was reviewed more negatively by the Los Angeles Times, who gave the album one and a half stars out of four.

Commercial 
The album debuted at #4 on the Billboard 200 with 78,000 copies sold in the first week released.

Track listing 

 Sample credits
 "This Is Why I'm Hot" contains samples of "Jesus Walks" performed by Kanye West, "Tell Me When to Go" performed by E-40, "Nuthin' but a G Thang" performed by Dr. Dre, "Walk It Out" performed by Unk and "Shook Ones Pt. II" performed by Mobb Deep.
 "It's Alright" contains a sample of "It's All Right" performed by Ray Charles.
 "Where I Belong" contains a sample of "Eternal Love" performed by Stephanie Mills.
 "Doctor Doctor" contains a sample of "Moonchild" performed by King Crimson.
 "I Did You Wrong" contains a sample of "If I Could Turn Back the Hands of Time" performed by R. Kelly.

Charts

Weekly charts

Year-end charts

References

External links 
 

2007 debut albums
Mims (rapper) albums
Capitol Records albums